The 74th annual Venice International Film Festival was held from 30 August to 9 September 2017. The jury president was announced as the actress Annette Bening on 5 July 2017. Downsizing, directed by Alexander Payne, was selected to open the festival. The Golden Lion, the highest prize given by the festival, was awarded to The Shape of Water, directed by Guillermo del Toro. 

A new section for virtual-reality (VR) films was introduced in this edition of the festival, as part of the Official Selection. 22 films were selected for the first-ever competition for films made in VR, while several more were presented in out-of-competition subsections.

Jury
The following people formed the 2017 juries:

Main Competition (Venezia 74)
Annette Bening, American actress (Jury President)
Ildikó Enyedi, Hungarian film director and screenwriter
Michel Franco, Mexican film director, producer and screenwriter
Rebecca Hall, English actress
Anna Mouglalis, French actress
David Stratton, Anglo-Australian film critic
Jasmine Trinca, Italian actress
Edgar Wright, English film director and screenwriter
Yonfan, Taiwanese-Hong Kong film director, producer and screenwriter

Horizons (Orizzonti)
Gianni Amelio, Italian director (President)
Rakhshan Bani Etemad, Iranian director
Ami Canaan Mann, American director
Mark Cousins, Irish-Scottish director, screenwriter and curator
Andrés Duprat, Argentinian screenwriter, architect and artistic curator
Fien Troch, Belgian director and screenwriter
Rebecca Zlotowski, French screenwriter and director

Opera Prima (Venice Award for a Debut Film)
 Benoît Jacquot, French director and screenwriter (President)
 Geoff Andrew, British writer and lecturer on film
 Albert Lee, Hong Kong producer
 Greta Scarano, Italian television, stage and film actress
 Yorgos Zois, Greek director

Venice Classics
 Giuseppe Piccioni, Italian director and screenwriter (President)
 26 students of Cinema History

Venice Virtual Reality
 John Landis, American director, screenwriter, actor and producer (President)
 Céline Sciamma, French screenwriter and director
 Ricky Tognazzi, Italian actor and film director

Official selection

In Competition 
The following films were selected for the main international competition:

Highlighted title indicates Golden Lion winner.

Out of Competition
The following films were selected to be screened out of competition:

Horizons
The following films were selected for the Horizons (Orizzonti) section:

Highlighted titles indicate Horizons Prizes for Best Feature Film and Best Short Film respectively.

Venice Classics
The following films were selected to be screened in the Venice Classics section:

Highlighted titles indicate the Best Restored Film and Best Documentary on Cinema official awards respectively.

Biennale College - Cinema
The following films were selected for the Biennale College - Cinema section.

Il Cinema nel Giardino
The following films were selected for the Il Cinema nel Giardino section:

Special screenings
The following films were presented as Special screening of the Official Selection:

Autonomous sections

International Critics' Week
The following films were selected for the 32nd Venice International Critics' Week:

{| class="wikitable" style="width:95%; margin-top:2px; margin-bottom:0px"
! colspan=5| Special Events
|-
! Line-up
! Italian title
! English title
! width="5%"| Min.
! Director(s)
|-
| Opening Short Film || Nausicaa L'altra odissea || Nausicaa - The Other Odyssey || 20' || Bepi Vigna
|-
| Closing Short Film || L’ultimo miracolo' || The Last Miracle || 20' || Enrico Pau
|}

Giornate degli Autori
The following films were selected for the 14th edition of the Giornate degli Autori section:

  
  
 

Highlighted title indicates the official Giornate degli Autori Award winner.

 Awards 
Official selection
The following official awards were presented at the 74th edition:

In Competition
Golden Lion: The Shape of Water by Guillermo del Toro
Grand Jury Prize: Foxtrot by Samuel Maoz
Silver Lion: Custody by Xavier Legrand
Volpi Cup for Best Actress: Charlotte Rampling for HannahVolpi Cup for Best Actor: Kamel El Basha for The Insult Best Screenplay Award: Three Billboards Outside Ebbing, Missouri by Martin McDonagh
Special Jury Prize: Sweet Country by Warwick Thornton
Marcello Mastroianni Award: Charlie Plummer for Lean on PeteHorizons (Orizzonti)
Best Film: Nico, 1988 by Susanna Nicchiarelli
Best Director: No Date, No Signature by Vahid Jalilvand
Special Jury Prize: Caniba by Verena Paravel and Lucien Castaing-Taylor
Best Actress: Lyna Khoudri for Les BienheureuxBest Actor: Navid Mohammadzadeh for No Date, No SignatureBest Screenplay: Oblivion Verses by Alireza Khatami
Horizons Prize for Best Short: Gros Chagrin by Céline Devaux

Lion of the Future
Luigi De Laurentiis Award for a Debut Film:  Custody by Xavier Legrand

Venezia Classici Awards
Best Documentary on Cinema: The Prince and the Dybbuk by Elwira Niewiera and Piotr Rosolowski
Best Restored Film: Come and See by Elem Klimov

Special Awards
Golden Lion For Lifetime Achievement: Robert Redford and Jane Fonda

Autonomous sections
The following collateral awards were conferred to films of the autonomous sections:

Venice International Critics' Week

SIAE Audience Award: Hunting Season by Natalia Garagiola
Verona Film Club Award: Team Hurricane by Annika Berg
Mario Serandrei – Hotel Saturnia Award for the Best Technical Contribution: The Wild Boys by Bertrand Mandico
SIAE Award: Saverio Costanzo
Mention FEDIC - Il giornale del cibo: Le Visite (Visiting Day) by Elio Di Pace

Giornate degli Autori
 GdA Director's Award: Candelaria by Jhonny Hendrix Hinestroza
 BNL People's Choice Award: Longing by Savi Gabizon
 Label Europa Cinema Award: M by Sara Forestier
 Fedeora Awards:
Best Film: Eye on Juliet by Kim Nguyen
Best Director of a Debut Film: Sara Forestier for MBest Actor: Redouanne Harjane for M Nuovo Imaie Talent Award:
Federica Rosellini for her role in Where the Shadows FallMimmo Borrelli for his role in Equilibrium Edipo Re Award: Valentina Pedicini for Where the Shadows Fall Lanterna Magica Award: Equilibrium by Vincenzo Marra

Other collateral awards
The following collateral awards were conferred to films of the official selection:

 Arca CinemaGiovani Award
Venezia 74 Best Film: Foxtrot by Samuel Maoz
Best Italian Film: Beautiful Things by Giorgio Ferrero (Biennale College - Cinema)
 Brian Award: Les Bienheureux by Sofia Djama (Horizons)
 "Civitas Vitae prossima" Award: Il colore nascosto delle cose by Silvio Soldini (Out of competition)
 Fair Play Cinema Award: Ex Libris: The New York Public Library by Frederick Wiseman
Special mention: Human Flow by Ai Weiwei
 FEDIC (Federazione Italiana dei Cineclub) Award: La Vita in Comune by Edoardo Winspeare (Horizons)
Special mention: Nico, 1988 by Susanna Nicchiarelli (Horizons)
 FIPRESCI Awards:
Best Film (Main competition): Ex Libris: The New York Public Library by Frederick Wiseman
Best Film (Horizons): Oblivion Verses by Alireza Khatami
 Fondazione Mimmo Rotella Award
George Clooney for SuburbiconAi Weiwei for Human FlowMichael Caine for My Generation Enrico Fulchignoni – CICT-UNESCO Award: Human Flow by Ai Weiwei
 Future Film Festival Digital Award: The Shape of Water by Guillermo del Toro
Special mention: Cinderella the Cat by Alessandro Rak, Ivan Cappiello, Marino Guarnieri, Dario Sansone
 Green Drop Award: First Reformed by Paul Schrader
 HRNs Award – Special Prize for Human Rights: The Rape of Recy Taylor by Nancy Buirski (Horizons)
Special mention: L'ordine delle cose by Andrea Segre (Special screenings)
Special mention: Human Flow by Ai Weiwei
 Interfilm Award: Oblivion Verses by Alireza Khatami
 Lanterna Magica Award (CGS): Equilibrium by Vincenzo Marra
 La Pellicola d’Oro Award:
Best Production Manager in an Italian Film: Daniele Spinozzi for Ammore e MalavitaBest Production Manager in an International Film: Riccardo Marchegiani for Mektoub, My Love: Canto UnoBest Stagehand: Roberto Di Pietro for Hannah Leoncino d'Oro Agiscuola per il Cinema Award: The Leisure Seeker by Paolo Virzì
Cinema for UNICEF Award: Human Flow by Ai Weiwei
 Lizzani Award: Il colore nascosto delle cose by Silvio Soldini (Out of competition)
 Lina Mangiacapre Award: Les Bienheureux by Sofia Djama (Horizons)
 Golden Mouse: Mektoub, My Love: Canto Uno by Abdellatif Kechiche
 Silver Mouse: Gatta Cenerentola by Alessandro Rak, Ivan Cappiello, Marino Guarnieri, Dario Sansone
 NuovoImaie Talent Award:
Best Actress: Federica Rosellini for Where the Shadows FallBest Actor: Mimmo Borrelli for Equilibrium Open Award: Gatta Cenerentola by Alessandro Rak, Ivan Cappiello, Marino Guarnieri, Dario Sansone
 Francesco Pasinetti Awards:
Best film: Ammore e malavita by Antonio Manetti, Marco Manetti
Best Cast: Giampaolo Morelli, Serena Rossi, Claudia Gerini, Carlo Buccirosso, Raiz , Franco Ricciardi, Antonio Buonomo for Ammore e malavitaSpecial award: Cinderella the Cat by Alessandro Rak, Ivan Cappiello, Marino Guarnieri, Dario Sansone] (Horizons)
Special award: Nico, 1988 by Susanna Nicchiarelli (Horizons)
 Queer Lion: Reinventing Marvin by Anne Fontaine (Horizons)
 Sfera 1932 Award: La mélodie by Rachid Hami (Out of competition)
 SIGNIS Award: The House by the Sea by Robert Guédiguian
Special mention: Foxtrot by Samuel Maoz
 C. Smithers Foundation Award – CICT-UNESCO: The Shape of Water by Guillermo del Toro
 Sorriso Diverso Venezia 2017 Award - Ass Ucl: Il colore nascosto delle cose by Silvio Soldini (Out of competition)
 Soundtrack Stars Award: Alexandre Desplat for The Shape of WaterSpecial award: Ammore e malavitaLifetime Achievement Award: Andrea Guerra
 UNIMED Award: The House by the Sea by Robert Guédiguian
Special mention: Ugly Nasty People by Cosimo Gomez (Horizons)
 Fragiacomo Award
George Clooney for SuburbiconAi Weiwei for Human FlowMichael Caine for My Generation (Out of competition)
 Robert Bresson Award: Gianni Amelio
 Franca Sozzani Award: Julianne Moore for Suburbicon''

References

External links
 
 Venice Film Festival 2017 Awards on IMDb

2017 film festivals
2017 in Italian cinema
August 2017 events in Italy
September 2017 events in Italy
74
Film